Treungen is a village in, and the administrative centre of Nissedal municipality, Telemark county in Norway.
Located just east of the village Tveitsund, it is a part of the urban area of the same name, which has a population of 361 as of 1 January 2009.  The village is the sole centre of population greater than 200 in the Nissedal municipality.

Treungen is surrounded by tall mountains and is situated where the river Nidelva begins at the southernmost part of Lake Nisser, Telemark's largest lake. Immediately south of Treungen is the lake Tjørull, Nissedal's second-largest lake. Rivers in Treungen includes Fyresåna and Nisseråna, which intersects the village.

The Old Norse name for Treungen was «Þriðjungrinn», meaning "a third part" and probably refers to an old division of the village.

Famous people from Treungen include Jan Gunnar Solli, international footballer.

General information

Treungen lies beside the southern end of lake Nisser, and the Telemarksveien (Norwegian National road 41) passes through the village northwards towards Vrådal and southwards towards Åmli in Aust-Agder. The state highway was widened after the Treungen railway was dismantled in 1967. Treungen was the railway terminus. Telemark Bilruter runs a bus route between Arendal and Seljord, and this route replaces the abandoned rail connection to Arendal.

Treungen is split into two by lake Nisser and in the middle of the village is Tveitsund bridge, a fine stone bridge adorned with concrete columns. The bridge was protected as a cultural monument in 1999. It is small, and traffic is controlled by lights. The inn is a building characteristic of Treungen's early days as a travel interchange between road and railway. The inn is in the Jugendstil of architecture, adorned with classical columns.

Throughout its history, Treungen has been closely linked with the town of Arendal and Aust-Agder county because lake Nisser was a part of the Arendal waterway and had its outflow through Nidelva. When timber was floated downriver, Treungen was an important hub. The timber came here along lake Nisser before being sent on its journey to Arendal.

Recreation

Treungen and surrounding Nissedal are home to a variety of hiking trails, including Havrefjelløypa and Heigeitilløypa, two trails connecting Nissedal with neighboring Gautefall. Various nearby mountain peaks offer hiking trails, including Hægefjell, Skornetten, and Skuggenatten. The trailhead for Skuggenatten (western peak of Baremslandsfjell) is located by Treungen sports arena, around one kilometer south of Treungen village center. Its peak at 706 meters above sea-level has panoramic views of surrounding areas including the village and adjacent Nisser Lake. Skuggenatten has been called the symbol of Treungen and is located near the village center. A cabin, cairn, and a mast can be found on top. The trailhead is situated on the opposite side of the road from Treungen Fire Station. Skuggenatten is the most popular mountain for hiking in Treungen. The trails here are also the best-marked hiking trails in Nissedal.

The trailhead for Skornetten, the highest point in Kyrkjebygdheia at 883 meters above sea-level, is situated by the seter at Espeli on the eastern side of Holmevatn and Breilivatn. From the trail are panoramic views of Breilivatn, Sylvtjønn, Breili, Holmevatn, Nordbygda, Tørdal, Gautefallheia, and more. From the peak are views of Fyresdal, Vrådal, Kviteseid, Seljord, Hesthomvarden, Hjasufsknatten, and as far as Risør and the ocean outside Kragerø.

A number of trailheads can be found by Bjønntjønn (“Bear Lake”) in Bjønntjønndalen (“Bear Valley”), including trails to Reinsvassnuten, Øverlandsvatnet, Gautefall Tourist Hotel, Heimdalsheia, and a lavvo at Breivassåsen by the lake Østre Breivatn. Several trailheads by Bjønntjønn can be found by the dam, Bjønntjønndammen, a floating dam (fløtningsdam) which was constructed by Sveinung Solli in 1900. The dam was in use until the 1960s and was restored by Gautefall Turlag in 2010. Various cross-country skiing trails were established near Bjønntjønn in 2008, including skiing trails to Gautefall Tourist Hotel and Bleka at Gautefallheia.

The trail to the peak at Reinvassnuten lies by Reinsvatn Lake where the oldest cabin at Gautefall can be found (Reinsvasshytta). Reinsvasshytta cabin was constructed by Amboritius Olsen Lindvig in 1900. Although the main trailhead for Reinsvassnuten is located at Gautefall Tourist Hotel, there are trailheads at Bleka in Gautefall as well as near the lakes Feletjønn and Bjønntjønn in Nissedal.

Lake Tjørull is located ten kilometers (6.2 mi.) south of Tjønnefoss in Treungen. The lake is home to a variety of islands and bays and is situated next to tall mountain peaks. It is used for a number of recreational activities such as canoeing, kayaking, fishing, swimming, rowing, and more. Wildlife such as eagles and beavers can often be seen by Tjørull.

References

Villages in Vestfold og Telemark
Nissedal